Scythris lamprochalca is a moth of the family Scythrididae. It was described by Edward Meyrick in 1931. It is found in Ethiopia, Uganda and Yemen.

The wingspan is about 13 mm. The forewings are rather dark shining bronze. The hindwings are dark grey.

References

lamprochalca
Moths described in 1931